Sriwijaya Air is an Indonesian airline headquartered and based at Soekarno–Hatta International Airport in Tangerang, Banten. It began its operations on 10 November 2003, and flies scheduled and chartered services on domestic routes within Indonesia as well as international routes to neighbouring countries. The airline's slogan is Your Flying Partner.

Sriwijaya Air is rated as a 3-Star Airline by Skytrax.

History

Founding (2003) 
Sriwijaya Air was founded in 2003 by Chandra Lie, Hendry Lie, Andi Halim, and Fandy Lingga, who named it after the historical Srivijaya empire. On 28 April 2003, it obtained its business license, while the AOC (Air Operator's Certificate) was issued later that year on 28 October. The airline commenced operations on 10 November 2003 with a maiden flight between Jakarta and Pangkal Pinang, operated by a single Boeing 737-200. This was followed by flights between Jakarta and Pontianak as well as Jakarta and Palembang. After its first year, the airline's growth enabled it to acquire four further Boeing 737-200s.

Growth (2007-2012) 
In 2007, Sriwijaya Air received the Boeing International Award for Safety and Maintenance of aircraft, awarded after passing the manufacturer's inspection that was carried out over a few months. On 18 December 2008, the airline commenced its first international operations serving a route between Jakarta and Singapore. By 2010, the airline was operating 27 aircraft and had served 7.18 million passengers and took an 11.8% share of the Indonesian domestic flight market.

On 20 June 2011 at the 2011 Paris Air Show, Sriwijaya Air agreed to buy 20 Embraer 190 jets, with purchase rights for 10 more. However, this order was suspended in 2012, citing pending price negotiations and considerations on keeping fleet commonality with Boeing aircraft. The airline's fleet expansion plans was followed by an announcement to acquire 12 used Boeing 737-500s from Continental Airlines on 11 November 2011 in a leasing deal worth $84 million. The aircraft were destined to replace the airline's ageing Boeing 737-200 fleet, with deliveries taking place between April and December 2011. 

In 2012, the airline introduced its first of six Boeing 737-800 aircraft in an expansion bid to fly routes to China. On 5 May 2012, Sriwijaya Air launched a Business Class service in a bid to become more upmarket, with the reconfiguration of its fleet to feature the new cabin. In February 2013, the airline announced its plans to enter the full service market with its subsidiary, NAM Air. In August 2013, the airline completed phasing out its Boeing 737-200 fleet, with plans to replace its entire Boeing 737 Classic fleet with the 10 Boeing 737 Next Generation aircraft it had on order. Its subsidiary, NAM Air commenced operations on 11 December 2013 and was repurposed as a feeder carrier for mainline Sriwijaya services.

Full-service ambitions and expansion (2012-2017) 
In 2012, Sriwijaya Air begun its planned transition into becoming a full-service carrier; this saw the reconfiguration of its entire fleet to be equipped with a business class cabin to fulfil the Indonesian government's criteria for a full service-carrier. However, by 2015, the airline admitted that it was not yet able to complete the transition, attributing it to several factors being unprepared for the goal; the airline instead remained as a medium service carrier, with commitments to a future transition to being a full-service carrier notwithstanding.

On 22 January 2014, the airline launched its first charter services to China, operating flights between Bali and Hangzhou, Nanjing, and Ningbo between January and February of that year. On 17 June 2015, Sriwijaya Air signed an order for two 737-900ER with a purchase option to acquire up to 20 Boeing 737 MAX at the 2015 Paris Airshow. This became the airline's first order for brand-new aircraft after nearly 12 years of operation. It took delivery of its first and second Boeing 737-900ER at the Boeing Delivery Center in Seattle on 23 August 2015. 

In September 2016, Sriwijaya Air announced its plans to acquire three used Boeing 777-200 aircraft to enable long-haul operations to China and hajj charter operations to Saudi Arabia, subject to funding from a initial public offering (IPO) anticipated in 2017. In November 2016, the plan to acquire said aircraft was amended in favour of two Boeing 777-300ERs and 15 Boeing 737-800s instead, still subject to the pending IPO. Neither the plan nor the IPO were realised, to which the company cited unfavourable market conditions for a public offering.

Cooperation with Garuda Indonesia (2018-2019) 

On 9 November 2018, Garuda Indonesia, through its subsidiary Citilink, took over operations as well as financial management of Sriwijaya Air with a Cooperation Agreement (KSO) mutually agreed upon by both airlines. The cooperation agreement had intended to rehabilitate and improve Sriwijaya Air's financial and operational performance and efficiency after significant losses the year prior. Under the agreement, both Sriwijaya Air and NAM Air would be operated as subsidiaries of Garuda Indonesia. The agreement between the two parties had also reportedly revolved around Sriwijaya Air's inability to fulfil obligations to pay its debt to GMF Aero Asia, Garuda Indonesia's aircraft maintenance subsidiary. 

On 24 September 2019, agreement broke down when GMF Aero Asia declined Sriwijaya aircraft maintenance services and removed engines and parts from Sriwijaya Air aircraft due to the latter's inability to pay its debt to the former. The dispute caused Sriwijaya to announce mass cancellations of its flights and triggered a lawsuit from Citilink over the debt. The agreement came back into force on 1 October after the two parties have mutually agreed to resolve their disputes. The reconciliation proved to be short-lived when the Cooperation Agreement (KSO) between Garuda Indonesia and Sriwijaya Air was ultimately terminated on November 8, 2019. Garuda Indonesia alleged Sriwijaya's inability to pay its leasing dues to aircraft lessors and an outstanding debt amounting to Rp 2.02 trillion to Indonesian state-owned enterprises (including Garuda and its subsidiaries) to have marked the collapse of the agreement. The severance of the agreement triggered safety concerns from the Indonesian Directorate General of Civil Aviation who announced aircraft airworthiness inspections amid the concerns. Following the split, the Sriwijaya Air Group announced agreements new contractors for ground and maintenance services unrelated to Garuda Indonesia.

COVID-19 Pandemic and financial difficulties (2021-present) 
In 2021, amid financial difficulties intensified by the COVID-19 pandemic and the crash on January 9, the airline cut its workforce and offered its employees to resign. Following the cuts, the Indonesian Ministry of Labour opened an inquiry on the airline after it allegedly failed to pay severance payments to its former employees. In October 2022, the airline entered a temporary debt restructuring measure (PKPU) following a request from a creditor fulfilled by the Central Jakarta District Court.

Subsidiaries 
Sriwijaya Air has three subsidiaries and business arms:
 NAM Air - A feeder carrier for Sriwijaya Air
 National Aviation Management - a flying school based in Pangkal Pinang, also known as NAM Flying School.
 National Aircrew Management - Crew Training Centre based in Jakarta, next to Sriwijaya Air headquarters. Also known as NAM Training Center.

Destinations 
As of January 2021, Sriwijaya Air serves domestic and international destinations as part of its merged network with sister company Nam Air.

Fleet

Current fleet
, the Sriwijaya Air fleet consists of the following aircraft:

The airline signed a LOI for 20 Boeing 737 MAX 8 at the 2015 Paris Air Show. Delivery was planned in 2017 or 2018 if finalized, but the actual order never took place and the airline cancelled lease for 2 MAX 9 in 2019 amid grounding.

Former fleet

Accidents and incidents 
On 27 August 2008, a Sriwijaya Air Boeing 737-200 (PK-CJG, c/n 23320) operating as flight Sriwijaya Air Flight 062 overran the runway at Sultan Thaha Airport, Jambi. There were 26 injuries and one fatality. The deceased was a farmer who was with his family in a hut sheltering from rain when it was struck by the plane.
On 20 December 2011, a Boeing 737-300 (PK-CKM, c/n 28333) on Sriwijaya Air Flight 230 encountered windshear on final approach and after touchdown veered off the runway while landing at Adisutjipto International Airport, Yogyakarta. The aircraft managed to touch down, but could not stop in time.  The aircraft came to a stop 25 meters past the runway end.  The right main landing gear and nose gear collapsed, causing the right engine and wing to become substantially damaged. There were no fatalities and two passengers received minor injuries during the evacuation. The aircraft was written off and stored near a road in Bali.
On 1 June 2012, a Boeing 737-400 (PK-CJV, c/n 24689), operating domestic flight as Sriwijaya Air Flight 188 from Jakarta to Pontianak veered off runway 15 during landing at Pontianak in heavy rain. The aircraft, after aquaplaning on the drenched runway, came to stop left of the tarmac on soft ground on its belly (the nose gear collapsed and the main landing gear sank into the soft soil) and received substantial damage. No injuries occurred, the airport was temporarily closed as its single runway was blocked by the accident. On 2 June the aircraft was removed from the runway by the use of heavy cranes and the airport reopened for normal traffic.
On 13 October 2012, a Sriwijaya flight from Medan, North Sumatra to Minangkabau International Airport, Padang, West Sumatra accidentally landed at Tabing Air Force Base, some 7 miles (12 km) away. None of the 96 passengers and 4 crew were injured.  The pilot and co-pilot were suspended and subsequently questioned by the NTSC.
 On 9 January 2021, a Boeing 737-500 (PK-CLC), operating as Sriwijaya Air Flight 182, crashed near Laki Island, shortly after taking off from Jakarta Soekarno-Hatta Airport, killing all 62 people on board (50 passengers and 12 crew). The flight was bound for Pontianak Supadio Airport. The cause of the incident was found to be a faulty engine auto-throttle system that was not properly maintained by the airline, and pilot error in failing to properly monitor asymmetrical thrust conditions.

See also
List of Sriwijaya Air destinations
Nam Air - Sriwijaya Air sister company
List of airlines of Indonesia

References

External links 

 

Airlines of Indonesia
Airlines established in 2003
Airlines formerly banned in the European Union
Indonesian brands
Indonesian companies established in 2003
Companies based in Tangerang